Şükrü Kaya (9 March 1883 – 10 January 1959) was a Turkish civil servant and politician, who served as government minister, Minister of Interior  and Minister of Foreign affairs in several governments.

Biography  

Born in İstanköy (Kos), part of the Dodecanese in the then Ottoman Empire, he finished Galatasaray High School before he graduated from Law School in 1908. He did his graduate work in Paris, France. He worked as inspector of treasury for the Empire.

At the start of World War I, Şükrü was appointed the Director of Settlement of Tribes and Migrants, and mainly tasked with managing the Armenian deportations during the Armenian genocide. In September 1915, he was transferred to Aleppo, an important location along the deportation route into the Syrian desert.

While the Armenian Genocide was underway, Şükrü was tasked to administrate the concentration camps of Armenian deportees located in Syria. In order to manage the large influx of Armenians into the area, Şükrü started a policy that enforced a certain ratio of Armenians to be left untouched. However, once the Armenians exceeded this ratio, they were evacuated from their camps and subsequently massacred. On 19 December 1915, Şükrü is noted to have said to German engineer Bastendorff the following:

He was then assigned to Iraq but he resigned and moved to İzmir.

He worked as a teacher in Buca Sultanisi (high school). After the Armistice of Mudros, he worked for the Turkish national movement. Following the occupation of Istanbul by the Entente powers, he was arrested by the British administration and was exiled to Malta. He escaped to the continent from Malta and subsequently went to Anatolia and joined the Turkish War of Independence.

In September 1925 he was a member of the Reform Council for the Reform of the East which prepared the Report for Reform in the East. In 1930 he was the author of the outlines of Turkification. Non-Turkish languages should be suppressed and non-Turkish names of locations changed to Turkish ones.

Şükrü Kaya served as Minister of Agriculture, Minister of Foreign Affairs and Interior Minister in several cabinets between 1924 and 1938.

He died on 10 January 1959, in Istanbul.

References

 Who is who database - Biography of Şükrü Kaya 

1883 births
Galatasaray High School alumni
Turkish writers
Turkish columnists
Agriculture ministers of Turkey
Ministers of Foreign Affairs of Turkey
1959 deaths
Malta exiles
Civil servants from the Ottoman Empire
Ministers of the Interior of Turkey
Turkish civil servants
Istanbul University Faculty of Law alumni
University of Paris alumni
Turkish educators
Mayors of İzmir
People of the Dersim rebellion
Armenian genocide perpetrators
Members of the 2nd government of Turkey
Members of the 3rd government of Turkey
Members of the 5th government of Turkey
Members of the 6th government of Turkey
Members of the 7th government of Turkey
Members of the 8th government of Turkey
Members of the 9th government of Turkey
Members of the 2nd Parliament of Turkey